The 2018 Sydney SuperNight 300 (formally known as 2018 Red Rooster Sydney SuperNight 300) was a motor racing event for the Supercars Championship, held on the weekend of 3–4 August 2018. The event was held at Sydney Motorsport Park in Eastern Creek, New South Wales and consisted of one race, 300 kilometres in length. It was the tenth event of sixteen in the 2018 Supercars Championship and hosted Race 21 of the season.

Results

Practice

Race 21

Qualifying

Race 

Notes
 – Tim Blanchard received a 5-second Time Penalty for careless driving, causing contact with Garth Tander.
 – Cameron Waters received a 15-second Time Penalty for careless driving, causing contact with Tim Slade.

Championship standings after Race 21 

Drivers' Championship standings

Teams Championship

 Note: Only the top five positions are included for both sets of standings.

References

Sydney SuperNight 300
Sydney SuperNight 300